D. J. Smith may refer to:

D. J. Smith (ice hockey) (born 1977), former ice hockey player
D. J. Smith (American football) (born 1989), American football linebacker

See also
Smith (surname)